V. C. Chandhirakumar is an Indian politician and was a member of the 14th Tamil Nadu Legislative Assembly from the Erode East constituency. He represented the Desiya Murpokku Dravida Kazhagam party.

The elections of 2016 resulted in his constituency being won by K. S. Thennarasu.

References 

Living people
Tamil Nadu MLAs 2011–2016
Desiya Murpokku Dravida Kazhagam politicians
Year of birth missing (living people)